An Education and Training Board (ETB) is one of sixteen statutory local education bodies that deliver a wide range of education services in the Republic of Ireland. ETBs manage a large number of secondary schools, further education colleges and training centres, multi-faith primary schools (Community National Schools) and adult education centres throughout the country. They deliver a growing number of apprenticeships and traineeships across the State.

Originating from the Education and Training Boards Act of 2013, ETBs came into existence on 1 July 2013, when they replaced the existing system of Vocational Education Committees (VECs) that had been in place since 1930. The training functions, which were the responsibility of the national training and employment authority Foras Áiseanna Saothair (FÁS), and which had been taken on by the VECs when FÁS was dissolved, were also transferred to the ETBs. ETBs are statutorily responsible for the provision of all further education and training in the Republic of Ireland.

Also deriving from the Education and Training Boards Act, Education and Training Boards Ireland (ETBI) was established in 2013, replacing the Irish Vocational Education Association (IVEA). ETBI is the national representative association for the sixteen ETBs, and works to protect, promote and enhance the interests of vocational education and training within the wider education sector and the country at large.

Number and constitution
There are 16 regional ETBS, replacing 33 VECs. On formation in 2013, the existing VEC members became members of the replacement boards.

Each board has 21 members: 
12 local authority representatives
2 staff representatives
2 parents' representatives
5 members from bodies representing community/business interests: one community/business interest representative must be drawn from business, industry and employers; one from learners' representative bodies and one must be representative of "bodies connected to school management or leadership".

External links
Education and Training Boards Ireland
Community National Schools

References

Education in the Republic of Ireland
Secondary education in Ireland
Seanad nominating bodies